Xu Haoyang (born 15 January 1999) is a Chinese footballer who currently plays for Wuhan Three Towns on loan from Shanghai Shenhua.

Club career
Xu Haoyang joined Chinese Super League side Shanghai Shenhua's youth academy in March 2018 when Shenhua bought Genbao Football Base's U19 teams. He was promoted to the first team squad in the summer break of 2018. On 22 September 2018, he made his senior debut in a 2–1 away defeat against Dalian Yifang, coming on as a substitute for Sun Shilin in the 89th minute.

On 11 September 2021 he was loaned out to second tier football club Beijing BSU for the 2020 China League One season. He would go on to score his first club goal on 15 October 2020 in a league game against Suzhou Dongwu F.C. in a 4-0 victory. The following season Xu was loaned out again to another second tier football club Wuhan Three Towns on 12 April 2021. He would go on to establish himself as regular within the team that won the division and promotion to the top tier at the end of the 2021 China League One campaign. The following season he would extend his loan with the club and go on to win the 2022 Chinese Super League title.

Career statistics
.

Honours

Club
Wuhan Three Towns
Chinese Super League: 2022.
China League One: 2021.

References

External links
Player stats at Soccerway.com

1999 births
Living people
Chinese footballers
People from Dazhou
Footballers from Sichuan
Shanghai Shenhua F.C. players
Beijing Sport University F.C. players
China League One players
Chinese Super League players
Association football midfielders
China under-20 international footballers